The Great Lakes Invitational (GLI) is a four-team National Collegiate Athletic Association (NCAA) men's ice hockey tournament held annually at Little Caesars Arena in Detroit around the New Year's holiday as part of College Hockey in the D.

The tournament was born out of a conversation between the general manager of Olympia Stadium, Lincoln Cavalieri, Michigan Tech's long-time coach, John MacInnes, and Detroit Red Wings scout Jack Paterson.  The three men were discussing the lack of American-born players in the National Hockey League (NHL) and concluded that a prestigious collegiate tournament could make a difference by promoting interest in hockey among young athletes, as well as the general public. Jack Tompkins, American Airlines vice president, former University of Michigan goalie, and a member of the Detroit Red Wings organization, championed their vision as well, and together in 1965, they founded the Great Lakes Invitational hockey tournament.

The GLI has grown into one of the premier college and holiday sporting events in the country, originating at Detroit's Olympia Stadium. Michigan Tech, the host for the tournament since its inception, added Michigan as a co-host in 1976. The tournament moved into Joe Louis Arena when the Red Wings' new home arena opened in December 1979. In 2017, with the closure of the Joe, the GLI relocated to the new Little Caesars Arena until at least the 2020-21 season.

Michigan State University is traditionally selected as a third participant while the fourth is a different team each season. Northern Michigan University was scheduled to be the 2020-21 invitee, but the tournament was cancelled.

The 2013 edition of the Invitational was held outdoors at Comerica Park, as part of festivities for the 2014 NHL Winter Classic at Michigan Stadium. Western Michigan defeated Michigan Tech 1–0 in overtime. The outdoor games were originally scheduled for 2012. However, due to the NHL lockout, the Winter Classic and all associated festivities were postponed to 2013–14.

Due to the COVID-19 pandemic, the Great Lakes Invitational was not held in 2020, marking the first year the tournament has not been played since its inception.  On December 27, 2021 Michigan cited player health concerns and backed out of the December 30 game against Western Michigan, COVID-19 was not cited as a reason.  However, Michigan played their first scheduled game of the tournament vs. Michigan Tech on December 29.  The result of the Western Michigan vs. Michigan game not being played was that no tournament winner was announced.

On June 8, 2022, the tournament field for the 2022 tournament was announced. Ferris State, Michigan State, Michigan Tech, and Western Michigan will be competing at Van Andel Arena in Grand Rapids, Michigan. This marks the first year the University of Michigan has not played since 1973.

Yearly results

Team records

Gallery

References

College ice hockey tournaments in the United States
Ice hockey competitions in Detroit
Michigan Tech Huskies men's ice hockey
Michigan Wolverines men's ice hockey
Michigan State Spartans ice hockey